Janette may refer to:

People 
 Janette Ahrens (1925–2016), American figure skater
 Janette Barber (born 1953), American comedian, television producer and writer
 Janette Hales Beckham (born 1933), general president of the LDS Young Women Organization
 Janette Beckman (born 1959), English photographer
 Jan Brittin (1959–2017), English cricketer born Janette Ann Brittin
 Janette Carter (1923–2006), American country musician
 Janette Anne Dimech (born 1951), Spanish singer who uses the stage name Jeanette
 Janette Garin (born 1972), Filipino politician
 Janette Geri (1961–2018), Australian singer-songwriter 
 Janette Turner Hospital (born 1942), Australian writer
 Janette Howard (born 1944), wife of the 25th Prime Minister of Australia
 Janette Husárová (born 1974), Slovak tennis player
 Janette Hill Knox (1845–1920), American reformer, suffragist, teacher, author 
 Janette Luu (born 1976), television broadcaster
 Janette McBride (born 1983), Filipino-Australian actress
 Janette Manrara (born 1983), Cuban-American dancer and presenter
 Janette Oke (born 1935), Canadian writer
 Janette Rallison (born 1966), American writer
 Janette Sadik-Khan (born 1960), Commissioner of the New York City Department of Transportation
 Janette Scott (born 1938), English actress

Characters 
 Janette du Charme, a character in the television series Forever Knight

Places 
 Janette Lake, Minnesota, U.S.

See also 
 Janet (disambiguation)
 Jeanette (given name)